Scheppers is a Dutch occupational surname. Literally meaning "creator's", it originally referred to a tailor. Notable people with the surname include:

Marguerite Scheppers (? – 1540), Dutch painter
Tanner Scheppers (born 1987), American baseball pitcher
Victor Scheppers (1802 – 1877), Flemish priest, founder of the Congregation of the Brothers of Scheppers and the Scheppersinstituut Mechelen

See also
De Schepper
Scheepers
Schepers

References

Dutch-language surnames
Occupational surnames